The World Group Play-offs for the 1993 Federation Cup was held during 22 July at the Waldstadion T.C. in Frankfurt, Germany, on clay courts.

The sixteen teams that were defeated in the first round of the World Group played off in eight ties, with the winning teams remaining in the World Group for 1994.

Canada vs. Uruguay

South Korea vs. New Zealand

South Africa vs. Israel

Germany vs. Austria

Colombia vs. Chile

Croatia vs. Belgium

Poland vs. Great Britain

Switzerland vs. Peru

References

External links
 Fed Cup website

World Group Play-offs
Tennis tournaments in Germany
Sports competitions in Frankfurt